"Young fogey" is a term humorously applied, in British context, to some younger-generation, rather buttoned-down men, many of whom were writers and journalists. The term is attributed to Alan Watkins writing in 1984 in The Spectator. However the term “Young-fogey conservative” was used by Larry Niven in Lucifer’s Hammer and by Philip Roth in The Professor of Desire, both in 1977.

"Young fogey" is still used to describe conservative young men (aged approximately between 15 and 40) who dress in a vintage style (usually that of the 1920s-1930s, also known as the "Brideshead" look, after the influence of the Evelyn Waugh novel Brideshead Revisited). Young fogeys tend towards erudite, conservative cultural pursuits, especially art and traditional architecture, rather than sports. The young fogey style of dress also has some surface similarity with the American preppy style, but is endogenous to the United Kingdom and Anglo-centric areas of the Commonwealth such as Australia, Canada and New Zealand.

History
The movement reached its peak in the late 1980s and early 1990s with champions such as A. N. Wilson, Gavin Stamp, John Martin Robinson, Simon Heffer and Charles Moore when it had a relatively widespread following in Southern England, but has declined since. Though generally a middle class phenomenon, it had a wider influence on fashions in the 1980s. Young fogeys are rarely rich or upper class and sometimes make a style virtue of genteel poverty, especially when rescuing old houses. They often combine a conservative cultural outlook with a distaste of Conservative political activity. Often Roman Catholic or Anglo-catholic in religious observance, their conservative outlook extends to refuting progressive theology.

Today committed young fogeys may be found amongst students at Oxford, Cambridge, Durham, Edinburgh and St Andrews universities; and at some universities in the Commonwealth, notably the University of Queensland and the University of Sydney. Adherents tend to concentrate in some professions: in particular the antiques and art dealing, residential estate agency, conservative classical architecture practices and certain strata of the Roman Catholic and Anglican churches. Strongholds of young fogeys include the Oxford University Conservative Association and Trinity College, Cambridge, but they are also seen elsewhere, with a smattering being found among Englishmen in University Conservative Associations everywhere.

People
Irish broadcaster Ryan Tubridy, who hosts The Late Late Show, has described himself as a "young fogey".

British Member of Parliament Jacob Rees-Mogg was described as a "young fogey" after his 2010 election to Westminster.

British writer, editor, and broadcaster Anthony Lejeune was described by The Times as: "always out of period, a misfit in the modern world for whom the term 'young fogey' might have been invented".

Publications
 Suzanne Lowry, The Young Fogey Handbook: a guide to backward mobility. Javelin Books, 1985.
The Chap magazine
  John Martin Robinson and Alexandra Artley The New Georgian Handbook. Harpers, London, 1985

See also
  and of old fogey

References

External links
The Young Fogey - An Elegy, 2003 Spectator article
Reflections of a Young Fogey

1980s neologisms
Academic culture
Academic slang
Age-related stereotypes
Conservatism in the United Kingdom
English culture
Fashion aesthetics
History of subcultures
Slang
Social class subcultures
Social groups
Youth culture in the United Kingdom